The 2020 Atlanta Braves season was the Braves' 55th season in Atlanta, 150th overall, and fourth season at Truist Park.

On March 12, 2020, MLB announced that because of the ongoing COVID-19 pandemic, the start of the regular season would be delayed by at least two weeks in addition to the remainder of spring training being cancelled. Four days later, it was announced that the start of the season would be pushed back indefinitely due to the recommendation made by the CDC to restrict events of more than 50 people for eight weeks. On June 23, commissioner Rob Manfred unilaterally implemented a 60-game season. Players reported to training camps on July 1 in order to resume spring training and prepare for a July 24 Opening Day. The Braves began the season at the New York Mets on July 24 and ended the season at home against the Boston Red Sox on September 27.

Due to the pandemic and the shortened season, Major League Baseball instituted certain rule changes which included the use of a universal designated hitter, a runner on second base to start extra innings, and a revised schedule.

In a series against the Boston Red Sox at Fenway Park, Marcell Ozuna and Adam Duvall became the first pair of teammates in MLB history to hit three home runs in consecutive games, Ozuna doing so on September 1 and Duvall on September 2. In their game against the Miami Marlins on September 9, the Braves scored 29 runs, one short of the MLB record set by the Texas Rangers in 2007. On September 22, the Braves clinched the NL East for the third straight year with a 11–1 win over the Miami Marlins. They then swept the Cincinnati Reds in the 2020 National League Wild Card Series for their first post-season series win since the 2001 season. They also swept the Miami Marlins in the 2020 National League Division Series and advanced to the 2020 National League Championship Series, their first NLCS appearance since 2001. They lost to the Los Angeles Dodgers in the NLCS after leading 3–1.

The Braves led MLB in hits (556), doubles (130), runs batted in (338), on-base percentage (.349), on-base plus slugging (.832), total bases (1,001) and plate appearances (2,344).

Offseason

Transactions

October 2019 

October 31: Francisco Cervelli, Darren O'Day, Brian McCann (announced his retirement following the Braves elimination for the division series), Josh Donaldson, Dallas Keuchel, Jerry Blevins, Chris Martin, Anthony Swarzak, Matt Joyce, Josh Tomlin, and Adeiny Hechavarria elected free agency.

November 2019 

November 4: Billy Hamilton and Julio Teheran had their options declined by the Braves and both players elected free agency.
November 8: Darren O'Day re-signed with the Braves on a one-year, $2.5 million contract with a club option for a second year.
November 14: Will Smith agreed on a three-year, $39 million contract. The deal includes a fourth year option worth $13 million with a $1 million buyout.
November 19: Chris Martin re-signed with the Braves on a two-year, $14 million contract.
November 24: Travis d'Arnaud signed a two-year, $16 million contract.

December 2019 

December 3: Cole Hamels signed a one-year, $18 million contract.

January 2020 

January 16: Adeiny Hechavarria re-signed with the Braves on a one-year, $1 million contract.
January 21: Marcell Ozuna signed a one-year, $18 million contract.

Regular season

Standings

National League East

National League Wild Card

Record vs. opponents

Opening Day starters

Game log 
Due to the COVID-19 pandemic, the regular season was shortened to 60 games with teams playing 10 games against each other member of their division while also playing four games against each team in the corresponding division in the other league. The Braves will, therefore, play 10 games against each team in their division and four games against each team in the American League East Division. On July 6, MLB announced the Braves' 60-game schedule which will begin on July 24 and end on September 27.

|- style="background:#fbb;"
| 1 || July 24 || @ Mets || 0–1 || Lugo (1–0) || Martin (0–1) || Díaz (1) || 0–1 || L1
|- style="background:#cfc;"
| 2 || July 25 || @ Mets || 5–3  || Jackson (1–0) || Strickland (0–1) || — || 1–1 || W1
|- style="background:#cfc;"
| 3 || July 26 || @ Mets || 14–1 || Chacín (1–0) || Porcello (0–1) || — || 2–1 || W2 
|- style="background:#fbb;"
| 4 || July 27 || @ Rays || 5–14 || Castillo (1–0) || Foltynewicz (0–1) || — || 2–2 || L1
|- style="background:#fbb;"
| 5 || July 28 || @ Rays || 2–5 || Fairbanks (1–0) || Wright (0–1) || Drake (2) || 2–3 || L2
|- style="background:#cfc;"
| 6 || July 29 || Rays || 7–4 || O'Day (1–0) || Drake (0–1) || Melancon (1) || 3–3 || W1
|- style="background:#cfc;"
| 7 || July 30 || Rays || 2–1 || Fried (1–0) || Yarbrough (0–1) || Melancon (2) || 4–3 || W2
|- style="background:#cfc;"
| 8 || July 31 || Mets || 11–10 || Dayton (1–0) || Lugo (1–1) || Martin (1) || 5–3 || W3
|-

|- style="background:#cfc;"
| 9 || August 1 || Mets || 7–1 || Tomlin (1–0) || Wacha (1–1) || — || 6–3 || W4
|- style="background:#cfc;"
| 10 || August 2 || Mets || 4–0 || Matzek (1–0) || Peterson (1–1) || — || 7–3 || W5
|- style="background:#fbb;"
| 11 || August 3 || Mets || 2–7 || deGrom (1–0) || Soroka (0–1) || — || 7–4 || L1
|- style="background:#cfc;"
| 12 || August 4 || Blue Jays || 10–1 || Fried (2–0) || Shoemaker (0–1) || — || 8–4 || W1
|- style="background:#fbb;"
| 13 || August 5 || Blue Jays || 1–2 || Ryu (1–1) || Newcomb (0–1) || Bass (2) || 8–5 || L1
|- style="background:#cfc;"
| 14 || August 6 || Blue Jays || 4–3 || Melancon (1–0) || Font (0–1) || — || 9–5 || W1 
|- style="background:#fbb;"
| 15 || August 8 || @ Phillies || 0–5 || Arrieta (1–1) || Wright (0–2) || — || 9–6 || L1
|- style="background:#cfc;"
| 16 || August 9 || @ Phillies || 5–2  || Matzek (2–0) || Guerra (1–1) || Melancon (3) || 10–6 || W1
|- style="background:#cfc;" 
| 17 || August 9 || @ Phillies || 8–0  || Fried (3–0) || Howard (0–1) || — || 11–6 || W2
|- style="background:#fbb;"
| 18 || August 10 || @ Phillies || 8–13 || Nola (1–1) || Newcomb (0–2) || — || 11–7 || L1
|- style="background:#fbb;"
| 19 || August 11 || @ Yankees || 6–9 || Montgomery (2–1) || Toussaint (0–1) || Britton (6) || 11–8 || L2
|- style="background:#fbb;"
| 20 || August 12 || @ Yankees || 3–6 || Loáisiga (2–0) || Matzek (2–1) || Britton (7) || 11–9 || L3
|- style="background:#fbb;"
| 21 || August 14 || @ Marlins || 2–8 || López (2–1) || Wright (0–3) || — || 11–10 || L4
|- style="background:#cfc;"
| 22 || August 15 || @ Marlins || 2–1 || Smith (1–0) || Kintzler (1–1) || Melancon (4) || 12–10 || W1
|- style="background:#cfc;"
| 23 || August 16 || @ Marlins || 4–0 || O'Day (2–0) || Vincent (1–1) || — || 13–10 || W2
|- style="background:#cfc;"
| 24 || August 17 || Nationals || 7–6 || Smith (2–0) || Hudson (1–2) || — || 14–10 || W3
|- style="background:#fbb;"
| 25 || August 18 || Nationals || 5–8 || Suero (1–0) || Matzek (2–2) || Hudson (5) || 14–11 || L1
|- style="background:#cfc;"
| 26 || August 21 || Phillies || 11–2 || Fried (4–0) || Nola (2–2) || — || 15–11 || W1
|- style="background:#cfc;"
| 27 || August 22 || Phillies || 6–5 || Melancon (2–0) || Workman (0–1) || — || 16–11 || W2
|- style="background:#fbb;"
| 28 || August 23 || Phillies || 4–5 || Eflin (1–1) || Tomlin (1–1) || Workman (5) || 16–12 || L1
|- style="background:#cfc;"
| 29 || August 26 || Yankees || 5–1  || Anderson (1–0) || Cole (4–1) || — || 17–12 || W1
|- style="background:#cfc;"
| 30 || August 26 || Yankees || 2–1  || Fried (5–0) || Green (2–1) || Melancon (5) || 18–12 || W2
|- style="background:#fbb;"
| 31 || August 28 || @ Phillies || 4–7  || Parker (2–0) || Melancon (2–1) || — || 18–13 || L1
|- style="background:#fbb;"
| 32 || August 29 || @ Phillies || 1–4 || Eflin (2–1) || Tomlin (1–2) || Workman (7) || 18–14 || L2
|- style="background:#cfc;" 
| 33 || August 30 || @ Phillies || 12–10 || Minter (1–0) || Arrieta (2–4) || Melancon (6)|| 19–14 || W1
|- style="background: #cfc;"
| 34 || August 31 || @ Red Sox || 6–3 || Fried (6–0) || Brewer (0–3) || Melancon (7) || 20–14 || W2
|-

|- style="background:#cfc;"
| 35 || September 1 || @ Red Sox || 10–3 || Anderson (2–0) || Stock (0–1) || — || 21–14 || W3
|- style="background:#cfc;"
| 36 || September 2 || @ Red Sox || 7–5 || Matzek (3–2) || Triggs (0–2) || Melancon (8) || 22–14 || W4
|- style="background:#cfc;"
| 37 || September 4 || Nationals || 7–1  || O'Day (3–0) || Voth (0–5) || — || 23–14 || W5
|- style="background:#fbb;"
| 38 || September 4 || Nationals || 9–10  || Suero (2–0) || Smith (2–1) || Hudson (7) || 23–15 || L1
|- style="background:#fbb;"
| 39 || September 5 || Nationals || 4–10 || McGowin (1–0) || Matzek (3–3) || — || 23–16 || L2
|- style="background:#cfc;"
| 40 || September 6 || Nationals || 10–3 || Tomlin (2–2) || Corbin (2–4) || — || 24–16 || W1
|- style="background:#fbb;"
| 41 || September 7 || Marlins || 4–5  || Kintzler (2–3) || Minter (1–1) || Vincent (3) || 24–17 || L1
|- style="background:#fbb;"
| 42 || September 8 || Marlins || 0–8 || Sánchez (2–1) || Wright (0–4) || — || 24–18 || L2
|- style="background:#cfc;"
| 43 || September 9 || Marlins || 29–9 || Dayton (2–0) || López (3–4) || Wilson (1) || 25–18 || W1
|- style="background:#cfc;" 
| 44 || September 10 || @ Nationals || 7–6 || Martin (1–1) || Rainey (1–1) || Melancon (9) || 26–18 || W2
|- style="background:#fbb;"
| 45 || September 11 || @ Nationals || 7–8  || Bourque (1–0) || Dayton (2–1) || — || 26–19 || L1
|- style="background:#cfc;"
| 46 || September 12 || @ Nationals || 2–1 || Anderson (3–0) || Corbin (2–5) || Melancon (10) || 27–19 || W1
|- style="background:#cfc;"
| 47 || September 13 || @ Nationals || 8–4 || Wright (1–4) || Scherzer (4–3) || — || 28–19 || W2
|- style="background:#fbb;"
| 48 || September 14 || @ Orioles || 1–14 || López (2–0) || Toussaint (0–2) || — || 28–20 || L1
|- style="background:#cfc;"
| 49 || September 15 || @ Orioles || 5–1 || O'Day (4–0) || Eshelman (3–1) || — || 29–20 || W1
|- style="background:#fbb;"
| 50 || September 16 || @ Orioles || 1–5 || Akin (1–1) || Hamels (0–1) || — || 29–21 || L1
|- style="background:#cfc;"
| 51 || September 18 || @ Mets || 15–2 || Fried (7–0) || Matz (0–5) || — || 30–21 || W1
|- style="background:#fbb;"
| 52 || September 19 || @ Mets || 2–7 || Peterson (5–2) || Anderson (3–1) || — || 30–22 || L1
|- style="background:#cfc;"
| 53 || September 20 || @ Mets || 7–0 || Wright (2–4) || Porcello (1–6) || — || 31–22 || W1
|- style="background:#cfc;"
| 54 || September 21 || Marlins || 5–4 || Matzek (4–3) || Rogers (1–2) || Melancon (11) || 32–22 || W2
|- style="background:#cfc;"
| 55 || September 22 || Marlins || 11–1 || Wilson (1–0) || Ureña (0–3) || — || 33–22 || W3
|- style="background:#cfc;"
| 56 || September 23 || Marlins || 9–4 || Jackson (2–0) || Smith (1–1) || — || 34–22 || W4
|- style="background:#fbb;"
| 57 || September 24 || Marlins || 2–4 || López (6–4) || Anderson (3–2) || Kintzler (11) || 34–23 || L1
|- style="background:#cfc;"
| 58 || September 25 || Red Sox || 8–7  || Greene (1–0) || Springs (0–2) || — || 35–23 || W1
|- style="background:#fbb;"
| 59 || September 26 || Red Sox || 2–8 || Houck (3–0) || Davidson (0–1) || — || 35–24 || L1
|- style="background:#fbb;"
| 60 || September 27 || Red Sox || 1–9 || Pivetta (2–0) || Smith (2–2) || — || 35–25 || L2
|-

|-
| Legend:       = Win       = Loss       = PostponementBold = Braves team memberRoster
Due to the COVID-19 pandemic and the resulting proposed shortened season, teams started the season with a 30-man roster. The rosters were reduce to 28 after two weeks and then to the new-normal roster size of 26 after that.

Postseason

Game log

|- style="background:#cfc;"
| 1 || September 30 || Reds || 1–0 (13) || Minter (1–0) || Bradley (0–1) || — || 1–0
|- style="background:#cfc;"
| 2 || October 1 || Reds || 5–0 || Anderson (1–0) || Castillo (0–1) || — || 2–0
|-

|- style="background:#cfc;"
| 1 || October 6 || Marlins || 9–5 || Smith (1–0) || Alcántara (0–1) || — || 1–0
|- style="background:#cfc;"
| 2 || October 7 || Marlins || 2–0 || Anderson (1–0) || López (0–1) || Melancon (1) || 2–0
|- style="background:#cfc;"
| 3 || October 8 || @ Marlins || 7–0 || Wright (1–0) || Sánchez (0–1) || — || 3–0
|-
| colspan=9|
|-

|- style="background:#cfc;"
| 1 || October 12 || @ Dodgers || 5–1 || Smith (1–0) || Treinen (0–1) || — || 10,700 || 1–0
|- style="background:#cfc;"
| 2 || October 13 || @ Dodgers || 8–7 || Matzek (1–0) || Gonsolin (0–1) || Melancon (1) || 10,624 || 2–0
|- style="background:#fbb;"
| 3 || October 14 || Dodgers || 3–15 || Urías (1–0) || Wright (0–1) || — || 10,664 || 2–1
|- style="background:#cfc;"
| 4 || October 15 || Dodgers || 10–2 || Wilson (1–0) || Kershaw (0–1) || — || 11,044 || 3–1
|- style="background:#fbb;"
| 5 || October 16 || Dodgers || 3–7 || Treinen (1–1) || Smith (1–1) || — || 11,119 || 3–2
|- style="background:#fbb;"
| 6 || October 17 || @ Dodgers || 1–3 || Buehler (1–0) || Fried (0–1) || Jansen (1) || 10,772 || 3–3
|- style="background: #fbb;"
| 7 || October 18 || @ Dodgers || 3–4 || Urías (2–0)|| Martin (0–1)|| — || 10,920||3–4
|-
| colspan=9| 
|-

Postseason rosters

| style="text-align:left" |
Pitchers: 19 Shane Greene 30 Kyle Wright 33 A. J. Minter 36 Mark Melancon 38 Josh Tomlin 48 Ian Anderson 51 Will Smith 54 Max Fried 55 Chris Martin 56 Darren O'Day 68 Tyler Matzek 71 Jacob Webb 75 Grant Dayton
Catchers: 16 Travis d'Arnaud 25 Tyler Flowers 60 William Contreras 
Infielders: 1 Ozzie Albies 5 Freddie Freeman 7 Dansby Swanson 8 Charlie Culberson 17 Johan Camargo 18 Pablo Sandoval 27 Austin Riley
Outfielders: 13 Ronald Acuña Jr. 14 Cristian Pache 22 Nick Markakis 23 Adam Duvall 
Designated hitters: 20 Marcell Ozuna
|- valign="top"
 

| style="text-align:left" |
Pitchers: 19 Shane Greene 30 Kyle Wright 33 A. J. Minter 36 Mark Melancon 38 Josh Tomlin 46 Bryse Wilson 48 Ian Anderson 51 Will Smith 54 Max Fried 55 Chris Martin 56 Darren O'Day 68 Tyler Matzek 71 Jacob Webb 73 Huascar Ynoa 75 Grant Dayton  
Catchers: 16 Travis d'Arnaud 25 Tyler Flowers
Infielders: 1 Ozzie Albies 5 Freddie Freeman 7 Dansby Swanson 8 Charlie Culberson 18 Pablo Sandoval 27 Austin Riley 
Outfielders: 13 Ronald Acuña Jr. 14 Cristian Pache 22 Nick Markakis 23 Adam Duvall 
Designated hitters: 20 Marcell Ozuna  
|- valign="top"
 

| style="text-align:left" |
Pitchers: 19 Shane Greene 30 Kyle Wright 33 A. J. Minter 36 Mark Melancon 38 Josh Tomlin 46 Bryse Wilson 48 Ian Anderson 51 Will Smith 54 Max Fried 55 Chris Martin 56 Darren O'Day 68 Tyler Matzek 71 Jacob Webb 73 Huascar Ynoa 75 Grant Dayton
Catchers: 16 Travis d'Arnaud 25 Tyler Flowers 
Infielders: 1 Ozzie Albies 5 Freddie Freeman 7 Dansby Swanson 8 Charlie Culberson 17 Johan Camargo  18 Pablo Sandoval 27 Austin Riley 
Outfielders: 13 Ronald Acuña Jr. 14 Cristian Pache 22 Nick Markakis 23 Adam Duvall 
Designated hitters: 20 Marcell Ozuna 
|- valign="top"

Farm system

References

External links
2020 Atlanta Braves season at Baseball Reference''

Atlanta Braves seasons
Atlanta Braves
Atlanta Braves
National League East champion seasons